Sorel Mizzi (born April 16, 1986 in Toronto, Ontario) is a Canadian professional poker player.  Mizzi plays online poker under the names of "Imper1um" and "Zangbezan24". , information gathered by Cardplayer.com's database states Sorel Mizzi has live tournament earnings of over $10.6 million. He also has online tournament earnings of approximately $3.6 million. He is also a regular in the online high-stakes cash games where he plays at Titan Poker under the name of 'Imper1um'.

Poker 
Mizzi's live tournament finishes include a tenth place at the September 2006 Ultimate Bet Aruba Poker Classic for $29,800, and in April 2007, a third place at the 2007 Irish Poker Open where he earned $280,284. In 2008 Mizzi finished 2nd in the £5,000 – Pot Limit Omaha Event at the 2008 World Series of Poker Europe.

As of 2014, Mizzi's live tournament winnings exceed $12,000,000. Sorel is sponsored by betting company Titan Poker.

In late December 2010, Mizzi was named both 2010 BLUFF Player of the Year  and 2010 PTPR Tournament Poker Player of the Year

World Poker Tour 
At the World Poker Tour Championship at the Bellagio in 2007, Mizzi finished 15th, winning $154,705. At the 2007 World Series of Poker, Mizzi cashed three times, including 208th in the no limit Texas hold'em main event.

At the 2008 Five Diamond World Poker Classic, Mizzi won the $3,000 No-Limit Hold'em event, earning $143,050.

Full Tilt Online Poker Series 
On February 15, 2007, Mizzi won Event #7 of FTOPS III, a $216 buy in No-Limit hold'em tournament with a prize of $90,384.

In May 2007, Mizzi won his 2nd FTOPS title, taking home $40,972 for his victory in event #8 of FTOPS IV, a $216 buy in Pot-Limit Hold'em tournament. The win made Mizzi the second player in FTOPS history to win two events.

In 2011, Mizzi topped the FTOPS XX leaderboard after cashing in 17 of the series 45 events and earning 1,365 points.

Full Tilt Poker scandal 
In December 2007, Mizzi admitted taking over from another location the account of his friend, Chris Vaughn, during the middle of a Full Tilt Poker tournament.  Mizzi went on to win the event but was disqualified, with first prize going to the original second-place finisher.  Mizzi apologized for his action.

Titan Poker sponsorship 

As of March, 2010, Sorel is sponsored by online poker room Titan Poker as the leader of their Pro Team.
During 2010, his major winnings include finishing 13th in the $5,000 buy-in no-limit hold’em event of EPT Caribbean Adventure for $16,295 and fifth in the heads-up event for $17,600; a 3rd place at the Aussie Millions Poker Championship in January for $659K. second place in February at the L.A. Poker Classic’s $500 buy-in double stack event ($20,530) and sixth in the Classic’s $1,000 buy-in hold’em event ($9,210); 1st place  at the Wynn Classic in the $2,000 buy-in no-limit hold’em event for $85,147 and a fifth place in the $1,500 buy-in no-limit hold’em event for $10,389. Sorel then followed it up by securing his first victories as a Titan Team captain during EPT Snowfest by winning two side events (€1,000+€100 NLHE Freezeout and  the €500+€50 rebuy tournament) for a total of $95K.

In April he finished 81st in the Main Event of NAPT Mohegan Sun for $8,500. Then he won 1st place for $170,000 at the Borgata Spring Poker Open's East Coast Championship in Atlantic City. Mizzi also took 6th place in the €25,000 buy-in EPT Monte Carlo High Roller Event for $190,000. He won a SCOOP title - $118,500 for 1st place in event #32, and a 2nd Place in the WPT High-Roller event (€20 000 buy-in) for €120 000.

References

External links
 Sorel Mizzi – Official page on TitanPoker
 Sorel Mizzi – Official page

1986 births
Canadian poker players
Canadian people of Maltese descent
Living people
Sportspeople from Toronto